Wide Blue Yonder (also released as All at Sea) is a 2010  Norwegian-British black comedy-drama film about an old rogue sailor who breaks all the rules to fulfil an old friend's dying wish to be buried at sea. The film was directed by Robert Young from a screenplay written by Hugh Janes, adapted from his successful stage play. It stars Brian Cox, Lauren Bacall and James Fox.

Plot
Two retired sailors, Wally and Skipper, are old workmates and best friends for 40 years now living at an old folks’ home in Norway. One day, Wally finds Skipper dead and he wants a burial at sea, the old-fashioned way, as he promised him. Wally isn't going to let the fact that he doesn't have a boat, any money or, for that matter, a body, stop him from keeping his word. He takes his friends May, George and Nina on a bold mission to send the coffin to the bottom of the North Sea. Ms. Reimark, the administrator of the local retirement community where Wally lives, has other plans for him and the deceased.

Cast
 Brian Cox as Wally
 Lauren Bacall as May
 James Fox as George
 Hege Schøyen as Ms. Reimark
 Ingrid Bolsø Berdal as Nina

Production
Wide Blue Yonder was originally written for the theatre by UK playwright Hugh Janes and staged in London's West End with Eric Sykes as the lead.

Filming
The film was shot on locations in Haugesund, Karmøy and Sveio from 13 July to mid-August 2007.

Problems with the film began during principal photography when UK producer John Cairns' Parkland Films and Norwegian producer Bjørg Veland's Euromax Productions were unable to pay their bills, including salary for cast and crew. They had raised only €2.4 million of the production's €6.4 million budget.

Norwegian producer Bjarne Hareide was brought in to restructure the financing, but when filming wrapped, €1.6 million local costs were still uncovered. New investments were needed to finish the feature and the film was finally ready for a star-studded world premiere at the Norwegian International Film Festival in 2010. However, it took another two years to clarify the rights, further complicated by the UK producer's bankruptcy.

Release
Wide Blue Yonder world premiered at the Norwegian International Film Festival in Haugesund on 19 August 2010 and was also screened at the 2011 Cannes Film Festival in May 2011. Five years after its completed production, it was finally released in Norway on 25 May 2012 and saw a limited release in the United States on 27 June 2014.

References

External links
 
 

2010 films
2010 comedy-drama films
Norwegian comedy-drama films
British comedy-drama films
2010s English-language films
English-language Norwegian films
British films based on plays
Films shot in Norway
Films set in Norway
Films directed by Robert Young
2010s British films